Birinchi May is a village in Naryn Region of Kyrgyzstan. It is part of the At-Bashy District. Its population was 1,262 in 2021.

The town of Ak-Moyun is 3 miles (5 km) to the north, and Taldy-Suu is 4 miles (7 km) to the east.

References

External links 
Satellite map at Maplandia.com

Populated places in Naryn Region